2-Ethylhexanol (abbreviated 2-EH) is an organic compound with formula CHO. It is a branched, eight-carbon chiral alcohol. It is a colorless liquid that is poorly soluble in water but soluble in most organic solvents. It is produced on a large scale (>2,000,000,000 kg/y) for use in numerous applications such as solvents, flavors, and fragrances and especially as a precursor for production of other chemicals such as emollients and plasticizers. It is encountered in plants, fruits, and wines. The odor has been reported as "heavy, earthy, and slightly floral" for the R enantiomer and "a light, sweet floral fragrance" for the S enantiomer.

Properties and applications
The branching in 2-ethylhexanol inhibits crystallization. Esters of 2-ethylhexanol are similarly affected, which together with low volatility, is the basis of applications in the production of plasticizers and lubricants, where its presence helps reduce viscosity and lower freezing points. Because 2-ethylhexanol is a fatty alcohol, its esters have emollient properties. Representative is the diester bis(2-ethylhexyl) phthalate (DEHP), commonly used in PVC. The triester tris (2-Ethylhexyl) trimellitate (TOTM) is another common plasticizer produced via the esterification of three 2-ethylhexanol per trimellitic acid.

It is also commonly used as a low volatility solvent. 2-Ethylhexanol can also be used as a cetane improver when reacted with nitric acid. It also used to react with epichlorohydrin and sodium hydroxide to produce the glycidyl ether of the molecule which is used as an epoxy reactive diluent in various coatings, adhesives and sealants applications. It can be used in the development of photos, production of rubber and extraction of oil and gas.

Industrial production
2-Ethylhexanol is produced industrially by the aldol condensation of n-butyraldehyde, followed by hydrogenation of the resulting hydroxyaldehyde.  About 2,500,000 tons are prepared in this way annually.

The n-butyraldehyde is made by hydroformylation of propylene, either in a self-contained plant or as the first step in a fully integrated facility.  Most facilities make n-butanol and isobutanol in addition to 2-ethylhexanol. Alcohols prepared in this way are sometimes referred to as oxo alcohols. The overall process is very similar to that of the Guerbet reaction, by which it may also be produced.

Health effects
2-Ethylhexanol exhibits low toxicity in animal models, with LD50 ranging from 2-3 g/kg (rat). 2-Ethylhexanol has been identified as a cause of indoor air quality related health problems, such as respiratory system irritation, as a volatile organic compound. 2-Ethylhexanol is emitted to air from a PVC flooring installed on concrete that had not been dried properly.

2-Ethylhexanol has been linked to developmental toxicity (increased incidence of skeletal malformations in fetuses).  This is thought to be a result of metabolism of 2-ethylhexanol into 2-ethylhexanoic acid via oxidation of the primary alcohol.  The teratogenicity of 2-ethylhexanoic acid, as well as similar substances such as valproic acid, has been well established.

Nomenclature
Although isooctanol (and the derived isooctyl prefix) is commonly used in industry to refer to 2-ethylhexanol and its derivatives, IUPAC naming conventions dictate that this name is properly applied to another isomer of octanol, 6-methylheptan-1-ol. The Chemical Abstracts Service likewise indexes isooctanol (CAS# 26952-21-6) as 6-methylheptan-1-ol.

See also
2-Ethylhexanoic acid

References

External links
 Isooctyl alcohol, National Institute for Occupational Safety and Health (NIOSH)

Alcohol solvents
Alkanols
Primary alcohols